Martha Schofield  (February 1, 1839 – February 1, 1916) was a Hicksite Quaker abolitionist and suffragist who founded a school in Aiken, South Carolina, for freed African Americans.

Biography

Martha Fell Schofield was born February 1, 1839, near Newtown Township, Bucks County, Pennsylvania, to Oliver W. Schofield and Mary (Jackson) Schofield. The family included four sisters and one brother. Her parents were Quaker and reformers. They worked for abolition, temperance, women's rights, and education. After the death of her father, the Schofields moved to Darby PA, where her parents were married (Darby Meeting Records 1834) and her mother had grown up. (Martha Schofield's diaries 1858, Friends Historical Library; Swarthmore, PA).

Schofield received her education initially through the local school in Newtown. Later,  she attended a school in Byberry, Philadelphia before going to the Sharon Female Seminary in Darby, now Sharon Hill, Pennsylvania. Her uncle and aunt, John and Rachel Tyson Jackson operated this seminary.

When she was finished at school Schofield became a teacher, beginning in Bayside, Long Island. Her mother's sister Eliza Bell lived there. Schofield also worked in Harrison, Westchester County. During the Civil War, Schofield worked in the Summit House military hospital though forbidden to nurse and so she ended up fundraising. Afterwards she moved to Wadmalaw Island, Edisto, St Helena and Johns Island, off South Carolina where there was a group of newly freed people in 1865. Her health suffered so she moved full time to Aiken, South Carolina. Schofield then founded a school in 1868. It went on to be known as the Schofield Normal and Industrial School. Funding for the school cam from both the Pennsylvania Friends Relief Association and from the state. When the school reached 200 students in 1882 it was incorporated. Additional funding came from the Hicksite Quakers. The school continued to grow doubling by the next year. Schofield spent considerable time every year fundraising. Within two years the school included a boarding facility and offered student aid. A new hall was funded by a donation in memory of Deborah F. Wharton by her sons. By 1910 the school had grown to include two town blocks as well as a 280-acre farm. Funding predominately came from annual subscriptions.

Schofield was a reformer in education but also a feminist and suffragist. She died on February 1, 1916, in Aiken. She was buried in Darby, Pennsylvania, at the Darby Friends Burial Ground. Her school became the Martha Schofield Junior High School in 1952. The Martha Schofield Scholarship Fund was first awarded in 1954.

Sources

External links 

 The Martha Schofield Papers held at Friends Historical Library of Swarthmore College
 Much of Martha Schofield’s papers have been digitized and are available at the In Her Own Right project

1839 births
1916 deaths
People from Newtown Township, Bucks County, Pennsylvania
Founders
19th-century Quakers
20th-century Quakers
American abolitionists
Schoolteachers from Pennsylvania
American suffragists
Women civil rights activists